The Au Gres River is a river in Michigan. Its mouth is at Lake Huron in the city of Au Gres, Michigan. It flows through Arenac, Iosco and Ogemaw counties. It formerly had an eastern branch, which was severed from the parent river and rerouted along the Whitney Drain to Lake Huron north of Au Gres.

See also
List of rivers of Michigan

References

Rivers of Michigan
Rivers of Arenac County, Michigan
Rivers of Iosco County, Michigan
Rivers of Ogemaw County, Michigan
Tributaries of Lake Huron
Saginaw Bay